King's Counsel are appointed by the provincial Cabinet on the advice of the Attorney General of British Columbia. No more than 7% of the bar of British Columbia can be appointed Queen's Counsel. Before making the recommendation to Cabinet, the Attorney General is required by statute to consult with the Chief Justice of British Columbia, the Chief Justice of the Supreme Court of British Columbia, and two benchers (directors) of the Law Society of British Columbia, one of whom is usually the president of the Law Society. The honorary appointment recognizes British Columbia lawyers for distinctive merit and exceptional contributions to the legal profession.  Successful candidates will have demonstrated professional integrity and good character and must have been a member of the British Columbia bar for at least five years. In practice, the Attorney General appoints an advisory committee which includes these officials and also the Chief Judge of the Provincial Court, the president of the British Columbia Branch of the Canadian Bar Association and the deputy attorney general. The Attorney General is automatically appointed as Queen's Counsel on taking office.

List of office holders
The following is a partial list of the office holders, based on annual announcements from the Attorney General of British Columbia:

References

Canadian King's Counsel